Kramgoa låtar 20 is a 1992 studio album by Vikingarna.

Track listing
Hem igen
För dina blåa ögons skull
But I Do
Kommer du till sommaren
En natt i Moskva
Teddy Bear
Du är min sommar, Marie
Vi har så mycket att säga varandra
Mona-Lisa
Jag tror på lyckan
Angelina min vän
Det är en viking
Jag vill älska
Varje brev
Are You Lonesome Tonight?

Chart positions

References 

1992 albums
Vikingarna (band) albums